Siege of Hulst may refer to:
 Siege of Hulst (1591), a Dutch and English victory led by Maurice of Orange
 Siege of Hulst (1596), a Spanish victory led by Archduke Albert
 Siege of Hulst (1645), a Dutch victory led by Frederick Henry